Since June 30, 1993, Malta has been subdivided into 68 localities, governed by local councils, meaning municipalities or borough. These form the most basic form of local government and there are no intermediate levels between it and the national level. The levels of the 6 districts (5 on the main island) and of the 5 regions (4 on the main island) serve statistical purposes.

According to the Local Councils Act (Chapter 363 of the Laws of Malta), Art. 3:
(1)  Every locality shall have a Council which shall have all such functions as are granted to it by this Act
...
(5) Each locality shall be referred to by the name as designated in the Second Schedule and any reference to that locality shall be by the name so designated.

List of Maltese local councils

List of Maltese local communities councils
These local community committees are going to operate from the beginning of July 2010, the Maltese Elections of Committees for Communities 2010 was held on Saturday March 27, in these hamlets:

 Il-Kumitat Amministrattiv ta' Bubaqra in Iż-Żurrieq
 Il-Kumitat Amministrattiv ta' Fleur-de-Lys in Birkirkara
 Il-Kumitat Amministrattiv tal-Kappara in San Ġwann
 Il-Kumitat Amministrattiv tal-Madliena in Is-Swieqi
 Il-Kumitat Amministrattiv ta' Marsalforn in Iż-Żebbuġ
 Il-Kumitat Amministrattiv ta' Paceville in San Ġiljan
 Il-Kumitat Amministrattiv ta' Santa Luċija, Għawdex in Ta' Kerċem
 Il-Kumitat Amministrattiv tax-Xlendi in Il-Munxar

In June 2010 were held also the elections for the local community committees, in these hamlets:

 Il-Kumitat Amministrattiv ta' Gwardmanġa in Tal-Pietà, Malta
 Il-Kumitat Amministrattiv tas-Swatar in Birkirkara and L-Imsida
 Il-Kumitat Amministrattiv tal-Baħrija in Ir-Rabat, Malta
 Il-Kumitat Amministrattiv ta' Baħar iċ-Ċagħaq in In-Naxxar
 Il-Kumitat Amministrattiv ta' San Pietru in Ħaż-Żabbar
 Il-Kumitat Amministrattiv ta' Burmarrad u l-Wardija in San Pawl il-Baħar
 Il-Kumitat Amministrattiv ta' Tal-Virtù in Ir-Rabat
 Il-Kumitat Amministrattiv ta' Ħal Farruġ in Ħal Luqa

All elections in these hamlets took place on the same day in the 2014 hamlet elections.

Other recognised hamlets without a local community committee
 Albert Town in Il-Marsa, Malta
 Bengħisa in Birżebbuġa
 Il-Bidnija in Il-Mosta/L-Imġarr
 Bir id-Deheb in Iż-Żejtun/Ħal Għaxaq
 Il-Blata l-Bajda in Il-Ħamrun/Il-Marsa, Malta
 Tal-Blata l-Għolja in Il-Mosta
 Buġibba in San Pawl il-Baħar
 Bulebel iż-Żgħir in Ħaż-Żabbar
 Il-Buskett in Dingli/Is-Siġġiewi
 Ġebel San Martin in Iż-Żejtun
 L-Għadira in Il-Mellieħa
 Tal-Ibraġ in Is-Swieqi
 Il-Magħtab in In-Naxxar
 Il-Manikata in Il-Mellieħa
 Il-Pwales in San Pawl il-Baħar
 Il-Qajjenza in Birżebbuġa
 Il-Qawra in San Pawl il-Baħar
 Tar-Rabbat in Il-Ħamrun
 Salina in In-Naxxar
 San Martin in San Pawl il-Baħar
 Santa Margerita in Mosta
 Santa Maria Estate in Il-Mellieħa
 Ta' Ganza in Iż-Żejtun
 Ta' Giorni in San Ġiljan
 Ta' Kassja in Gozo
 Ta' Taħt iċ-Ċint in Iż-Żurrieq 
 Tal-Barmil in Gozo
 Tal-Bebbux in Iż-Żurrieq
 Tal-Ħawli in Il-Birgu
 Tal-Millieri in Ħal Għaxaq
 Tal-Plier in Ħaż-Żabbar
 Tal-Qattus (Birkirkara) in Birkirkara
 Tal-Qattus (Għaxaq) in Ħal Għaxaq
 Tas-Salib in Il-Mellieħa
 Ta' Żwejt in San Ġwann
 Victoria Gardens in Is-Swieqi
 Wied iż-Żurrieq in Il-Qrendi
 Ix-Xemxija in San Pawl il-Baħar
 Ix-Xwieki in Ħal Għargħur
 Iż-Żebbiegħ in L-Imġarr
 Ta' Żokkrija in Il-Mosta

See also
 2005 Maltese local council elections
 2006 Maltese local council elections
 2007 Maltese local council elections
 2008 Maltese local council elections
 2009 Maltese local council elections
 Maltese local council elections, 2010
 2012 Maltese local council elections
2015 Maltese local council elections
 List of cities in Malta
 List of mayors of Malta
 ISO 3166-2:MT

References

External links

 Local Councils Act and amendments
 CityMayors.com article
 Local Councils' Association

 
Subdivisions of Malta
Malta
Malta
Malta
Malta
Malta politics-related lists
Malta geography-related lists